Victor Dan Găureanu, better known as Dan Găureanu  (15 November 1967 – 20 May 2017) was a Romanian fencer. 

He competed in the sabre events at the 1992 and 2000 Summer Olympics. He won the bronze medal at the 1999 World Fencing Championships after he was defeated by Wiradech Kothny, who eventually won the gold medal. As part of the Romanian team he earned two bronze medals at the World Championships.

He died on 20 May 2017.

References

External links
 

1967 births
2017 deaths
Romanian male fencers
Romanian sabre fencers
Olympic fencers of Romania
Fencers at the 1992 Summer Olympics
Fencers at the 2000 Summer Olympics
People from Botoșani County